The Observator was a newspaper written in the form of a dialogue by Roger L'Estrange, and published from April 13, 1681 to March 9, 1687.

L'Estrange was a defender of the Monarchy, and promoted his anti-whig agenda through The Observator.

Most issues were printed by the Brome family in London, England, at the "Gun in S. Pauls Church-yard".

External links

References
 The Cambridge History of English and American Literature in 18 Volumes 
 The Augustan Reprint Society.  Selections from The Observator.  William Andrews Clark Memorial Library: University of California, Los Angeles.  1970.

Defunct newspapers published in the United Kingdom
1681 establishments in England